Anatoma finlayi is a species of minute sea snail, a marine gastropod mollusc or micromollusk in the family Anatomidae.

Distribution
This marine species occurs off New Zealand

References

 Powell A. W. B., New Zealand Mollusca, William Collins Publishers Ltd, Auckland, New Zealand 1979 
 Geiger D.L. & Sasaki T. (2008) Four new species of Anatomidae (Mollusca: Vetigastropoda) from the Indian Ocean (Reunion, Mayotte) and Australia, with notes on a novel radular type for the family. Zoosymposia 1: 247-164.
 Geiger D.L. (2012) Monograph of the little slit shells. Volume 1. Introduction, Scissurellidae. pp. 1-728. Volume 2. Anatomidae, Larocheidae, Depressizonidae, Sutilizonidae, Temnocinclidae. pp. 729–1291. Santa Barbara Museum of Natural History Monographs Number 7.

External links

Gastropods of New Zealand